Shishir Kumar was an Indian politician . He was a Member of Parliament, representing Bihar in the Rajya Sabha the upper house of India's Parliament as a member of the Praja Socialist Party.

References

Rajya Sabha members from Bihar
Praja Socialist Party politicians
Year of birth missing
Year of death missing